Choi Hye-in (Hangul: 최혜인; born 8 August 1992) is a Korean badminton player who affiliated Daekyo badminton team since 2011, and later representing Incheon International Airport.

Career 
Choi who educated at the Beomseo High School in Ulsan, was one of Korea's top junior players. She clinched three titles at the 2010 German Junior Open, winning the girls' singles, girls' doubles, and mixed doubles events. The same year, she was runner-up in mixed doubles at the 2010 World Junior Championships. She also represented Korea in the badminton at the Youth Olympic Games in Singapore.

As a senior, she focused exclusively on doubles and played with various partners, reaching the 2012 Macau Open final with Kim So-yeong and the final of the 2013 Korea Grand Prix Gold with Kang Ji-wook. Her first major senior title came in 2014, when she and Lee So-hee won the women's doubles title at the 2014 Canada Open. Choi tried out, but was not selected for the national team in December 2014.

Achievements

Asian Championships 
Mixed doubles

BWF World Junior Championships 
Girls' doubles

Mixed doubles

BWF Grand Prix 
The BWF Grand Prix had two levels, the Grand Prix and Grand Prix Gold. It was a series of badminton tournaments sanctioned by the Badminton World Federation (BWF) and played between 2007 and 2017.

Women's doubles

Mixed doubles

  BWF Grand Prix Gold tournament
  BWF Grand Prix tournament

BWF International Challenge/Series 
Women's doubles

Mixed doubles

  BWF International Challenge tournament
  BWF International Series tournament

References 

Living people
1992 births
Sportspeople from Ulsan
South Korean female badminton players
Badminton players at the 2010 Summer Youth Olympics